Philothermus puberulus is a species of minute bark beetle in the family Cerylonidae. It is found in the Caribbean Sea, Central America, and North America.

References

Further reading

 
 

Cerylonidae
Articles created by Qbugbot
Beetles described in 1878